Ronnbergia veitchii is a species of flowering plant in the family Bromeliaceae, native to Costa Rica, Panama, Colombia, Peru and Ecuador. It was first described in 1877 as Aechmea veitchii.

References

Bromelioideae
Flora of Costa Rica
Flora of Panama
Flora of South America
Plants described in 1877